Lake Bacalar (or Laguna Bacalar) is a long, narrow lake in the state of Quintana Roo, Mexico near Mexico's border with Belize. It is approximately 42 km long measured from north to south, and less than 2 km at its widest. The lake is renowned for its striking blue color and water clarity, partly the result of having a white limestone bottom. Like most bodies of water in the Yucatán peninsula, the lake is fed by underground rivers, whose regular open pools are cenotes. Because of the porous limestone, the Yucatán Peninsula has almost no lakes, this is by far the largest, and fed by the 450 km underground river that is part of the worlds's largest water cave/tunnel system, paralleling the coast.

It contains a huge population of the oldest life on the planet, the cauliflower-like stromatolites that only still exist in a few locations globally.
On the lake's western shore is the village of Bacalar, population 11,084.

In November 2015, Mexico's federal environmental protection agency issued a pollution alert for Lake Bacalar as a result of illegal dumping and inadequate wastewater treatment.

References

Bacalar
Landforms of Quintana Roo